The 1993–94 League of Ireland Premier Division was the 9th season of the League of Ireland Premier Division. The division was made up of 12 teams. Shamrock Rovers won the title.

Regular season
The regular season initially saw the 12 teams use a traditional round-robin format with each team playing 22 games on a home and away basis. The division was then split into two groups, a top six and a bottom six. After the split, the six teams played the other teams in their group in a second series of 10 games again using a round-robin format.

Final Table

Results

Matches 1–22

Matches 23–32

Top Six

Bottom Six

Promotion/relegation play-off
Cobh Ramblers F.C. who finished in tenth place played off against Finn Harps F.C., the third placed team from the 1993–94 League of Ireland First Division.

1st Leg

2nd Leg

Cobh Ramblers F.C. won 3–1 on aggregate and retain their place in the Premier Division

See also
 1993–94 League of Ireland First Division

Notes

References

Ireland
1993–94 in Republic of Ireland association football
League of Ireland Premier Division seasons